Hagam is ward 6 of Jugal Rural Municipality in Sindhupalchok District in the Bagmati of central Nepal. At the time of the 1991 Nepal census it had a population of 3683 and had 703 houses in the village.

References

Populated places in Sindhupalchowk District